L. Patrick Devlin (April 11, 1939 – June 22, 2022) was a specialist in media and politics. Devlin was a professor of communication at the University of Rhode Island, having held the post for over thirty years until 2008, when he retired. He authored books such as Contemporary Political Speaking (1971) and Political Persuasion in Presidential Campaigns (1987).

Devlin died on June 22, 2022, at the age of 83.

References

External links
Faculty Page

1939 births
2022 deaths
University of Rhode Island faculty
20th-century American male writers
20th-century American non-fiction writers
American male non-fiction writers